Chitra is a 2001 Indian Kannada-language romantic drama film directed by Dinesh Babu and produced by Ramoji Rao. A remake of the Telugu film Chitram (2000), directed by Teja, the film stars Prasad and newcomer Rekha Vedavyas with Ananth Nag in a supporting role. The film had musical score by Gurukiran, which was well received. The film, upon release, was well received and declared a silver jubilee at the box office.

Cast 

 Prasad as Ramu 
 Rekha Vedavyas as Chitra (credited as Chitra)
 Ananth Nag as Ramu's father
 Anirudh Jatkar as Ramu's friend
 Sunil Raoh as Ramu's friend
 Sharan
 Gurukiran
 Master Anand as Prashanth 
 Vinayak Joshi
 Ganesh Varsha
 Sanketh Kashi as Govinda, Kannada lecturer 
 Naga Prasad 
 Ramesh Bhat 
 Ashalatha 
 Vanitha Vaasu 
 Bank Janardhan
 Mandeep Rai
 Sri Gowri 
 Master Arun 
 Baby Raksha
 John D'Souza 
 M. N. Suresh

Production 
This is Prabhu Deva's brother Prasad's first Kannada film. Model Rekha Vedavyas plays an NRI student in the film. She received the role after one of the producers, Jayashri Devi, saw her photographs.

Soundtrack 

The music of the film was composed by Gurukiran. The soundtrack was well received upon release and Gurukiran won the Filmfare Award for Best Music Director for the year 2001.

Reception 
A critic from Chitraloka wrote that "No fights, not much of melodrama (exception to first half) a bunch of friends looking after the comedy department and Gurukiran to make you crazy and of course handling the minute elements effectively is what draws you to this film".

References

External links 
 Chitra songs at Raaga

2001 films
2000s Kannada-language films
2001 romantic drama films
Indian romantic drama films
Kannada remakes of Telugu films
Films scored by Gurukiran
Teenage pregnancy in film
Films directed by Dinesh Baboo